The Pancoast Pelican is an American twin-engine homebuilt aircraft.

Design and development
The Pelican is a two place side-by-side configuration, high-wing, twin-engine, tricycle gear aircraft. The open cockpit aircraft is of all-wood construction with a plywood fuselage. The tail section is removable for ground transportation on a trailer.

Specifications (Pelican)

References

Homebuilt aircraft